Echeverría is a station on Line B of the Buenos Aires Underground. It was first opened on July 26, 2013, as part of the extension of the line from Los Incas - Parque Chas to Juan Manuel de Rosas.

Gallery

References

External links

Buenos Aires Underground stations
Railway stations opened in 2013
2013 establishments in Argentina